Bangladesh Pratidin, literally meaning Bangladesh Everyday, is a daily, Bengali-language independent newspaper in Bangladesh. It was founded on 15 March 2010. Bangladesh Pratidin tops the list of highest circulated dailies in the country out of 345 newspapers published from Dhaka and elsewhere, the information minister told parliament 10 March 2014. Its editor is Naem Nizam. Bangladesh Pratidin is a subsidiary of East West Media Group, which is owned by Bashundhara Group. On behalf of East West Media Group, the publisher of the newspaper is Moynal Hossain Chowdhury.

The Bashundhara Group is diversifying its operations, beginning with real estate and moving on to the steel industry. One of their key businesses is paper-based manufacture. East-West Media Group Ltd, their new company, was founded in 2009.

It presently owns four of Bangladesh's major media outlets. One of them is the daily Bangladesh Pratidin. It is published in Dhaka's Bashundhara neighbourhood. According to their stats, they have the most circulation in Bangladesh. Their daily circulation is over 5,50,000 copies.

Litigation 
In February 2017 the Savar based correspondent of the paper was arrested by Bangladesh Police for fermenting labor unrest, attacking factories, and stealing garments. His lawyer accused the police of torturing him in custody. His family and lawyer claimed he was arrested for his reports on police extortion of garment factory owners.

See also
List of newspapers in Bangladesh
New Age
The Daily Ittefaq
Prothom Alo

References

External links
 Official Website
 Print copies of the Website

Bengali-language newspapers published in Bangladesh
Daily newspapers published in Bangladesh
Newspapers established in 2010
2010 establishments in Bangladesh
Newspapers published in Dhaka